Interstate 375 (I-375) is a north–south auxiliary Interstate Highway in the city of Detroit, Michigan, United States. It is the southernmost leg of the Walter P. Chrysler Freeway and a spur of I-75 into Downtown Detroit, ending at the unsigned Business Spur I-375 (BS I-375), better known as Jefferson Avenue. The freeway opened on June 12, 1964. At only  in length, it once had the distinction of being the shortest signed Interstate Highway in the country before I-110 in El Paso, Texas, was signed. The Michigan Department of Transportation (MDOT) announced in 2013 that it may remove I-375 in the future, and in 2021 the department announced plans to move forward converting the freeway to a boulevard.

Route description
I-375 and the Chrysler Freeway begin at Jefferson Avenue between St. Antoine Street and Beaubien  Street in Downtown Detroit near the Renaissance Center. The freeway runs east before turning north. Just about a mile (1.6 km) after the southern terminus, I-375 meets the Fisher Freeway which carries I-75 north of downtown. At this interchange, I-75 takes ramps to leave the Fisher Freeway and use the Chrysler Freeway, replacing I-375. I-375 is a four-lane freeway south of the I-75 interchange, where it widens to six lanes. The entire length of I-375 is included on the National Highway System, a network of roadways that are important to the country's economy, defense, and mobility.

At the time it opened until at least 2007, I-375 was the shortest signed Interstate in the country. Based on Federal Highway Administration (FHWA) data, there are three Interstates that are shorter: I-110 in Texas, I-878 in New York, and I-315 in Montana. The latter two designations are not signed on their respective roadways, and I-110 in Texas has since been signed.

Every year, MDOT conducts a series of surveys on its highways in the state to measure traffic volume. In 2009, MDOT calculated that 14,112 vehicles per day used the southernmost section of I-375 on average and 53,900 vehicles used the northernmost section near I-75. These vehicles included 798 trucks.

History
Construction on the first segments of the Chrysler Freeway started on January 30, 1959. The area where the freeway was built was called Black Bottom, a historic district that received its name from the soil found there by French explorers. In the 1940s and 1950s, the area was home to a community of African-American entrepreneurs and businesses that rivaled Harlem in New York City. Black Bottom was one of the oldest neighborhoods in the city, and, at the time of freeway construction, it had wooden sewers and dilapidated buildings. In the 1950s and 1960s, many lower-class African-American residents lived in overcrowded and run-down housing in Black Bottom. These residents could not afford to maintain their homes because of their low income, leading outsiders to view the area as neglected and in need of updating and development. The area, like Corktown to the west of downtown, was targeted by urban planners for urban renewal and infrastructure improvements in the 1950s and 1960s, which included the Chrysler Freeway and public housing projects. In the case of the construction of the Chrysler Freeway, some of the most crucial entertainment and cultural communities in Detroit, Black Bottom, and Paradise Valley were destroyed.

On June 12, 1964, a surface street highway/freeway in Detroit that ran north from Jefferson Avenue and Randolph Street to the Fisher/Chrysler freeway interchange was opened. The southernmost segment, built through the Black Bottom neighborhood, was designated I-375 at this time. The freeway cost $50 million to build (equivalent to $ in ).

Future
In April 2013, MDOT announced that it was studying whether to repair the freeway at a cost of $80 million (equivalent to $ in ) or convert the freeway south of Gratiot Avenue into a boulevard to reduce maintenance cost. This change would make the area more pedestrian-friendly and bring new developers and residents into the neighborhood. Converting this segment of the freeway and its right-of-way to a boulevard would free up  of land for development. The department invited businesses and other groups affected by the potential project to participate in the study in November 2013. Advocates of the conversion cite increased pedestrian access and an improved connection between Eastern Market and downtown as reasons to remove the freeway. Also, because the freeway has outdated geometric conditions, such as ramp widths and curvature, the high crash rates and congestion of I-375 are used to support the freeway's removal. Some people who live or work along the freeway and in the downtown area note the improved access I-375 provides to the area as reasons to retain the freeway.

Six alternative proposals for rebuilding I-375 were unveiled by MDOT in June 2014. They ranged in price from $40 million to $80 million (equivalent to $– in ). These options included rebuilding the freeway as is, reducing it to a boulevard or multiple one-way streets, or upgrading the existing freeway right-of-way to include bike lanes and other pedestrian-friendly features. In January 2016, the department announced that any decision on a course of action would be delayed indefinitely. However, in May 2017, MDOT announced it was going forward with an environmental assessment to identify a preferred alternative. In December 2017, the department announced that they were down to two alternatives, both of which involved replacing the freeway with a boulevard. Both alternatives presented included a four-lane surface boulevard between Gratiot Avenue and Atwater Street. 

In January 2020, the State Transportation Commission removed the project from its five-year plan citing other priorities, pushing the potential completion of the project back to 2027. A refined locally preferred alternative (LPA) consisting of a boulevard aligned within the southbound lanes of the current freeway was chosen in January 2021. The proposed boulevard is six lanes between the interchanges with I-75 and Jefferson Avenue, and four lanes in width south of Jefferson; it also includes a two-way cycle track on the east side of the boulevard. Costs for the full project were estimated at $250 million, including $200 million for the reconstruction of the interchange, $50 million for the boulevard, and $20 million for reconstruction of Gratiot Avenue east of the intersection. 

In November 2021, Governor Gretchen Whitmer requested funding for the project from the United States Department of Transportation under the newly created Reconnecting Communities program. In March 2022, the Federal Highway Administration returned a finding of no significant impact (FONSI), allowing the project to enter its design phase. On September 15, 2022, it was announced by the US Secretary of Transportation Pete Buttigieg that the state of Michigan had received a $105 million federal grant from the Infrastructure for Rebuilding America grant program for the project; reactions to the announcement were mixed at the time. MDOT announced that construction would start in 2025 with an expected completion in 2028.

Exit list

Business spur

Jefferson Avenue past that intersection is M-10. BS I-375 runs next to the Renaissance Center and under a segment of the People Mover. This designation was created in 1964. The 2009 traffic surveys by MDOT reported that 33,376 vehicles, including 922 trucks, had used BS I-375 on an average day.

Major junctions

See also

Notes

References

External links

I-375 at Michigan Highways
BS I-375 at Michigan Highways
I-375 Michigan at Kurumi
I-375 Michigan at the Interstate Guide
Michigan - Interstate 375 South - Full Length at YouTube
 

75-3 Michigan
75-3
3 Michigan
Transportation in Detroit